Harrogate Town A.F.C. is a professional association football club in Harrogate, North Yorkshire, England, which competes in League Two, the fourth tier of the English football league system.

The club is nicknamed the Sulphurites, due to the spa town's sulphur springs. The club's colours are black and yellow and they play home games at Wetherby Road.

Harrogate Hotspurs were founded in 1919 and changed their name to Harrogate Town after football returned at the end of the Second World War, joining the West Yorkshire Association League. They entered the Yorkshire League again in 1957, before becoming founder members of the Northern Counties East League in 1982 and a founding member of the Northern Premier League's First Division in 1987. They won the Northern Premier League Division One title in 2001–02 and became founder members of the Conference North in 2004. They won the National League North play-offs in 2018 and secured a place in the Football League for the first time with victory in the 2020 National League play-off Final. The team won the 2019–20 FA Trophy Final against Concord Rangers.

History

Early history
People in the town of Harrogate had tried to put together a football team as far back as 1907 but it took until 1914 for Harrogate A.F.C. to be founded. They were entered into the Northern Football League in 1914, and were set to play their home fixtures at the County Ground, but the First World War meant all fixtures were postponed.

After the First World War, Robert Ackrill Breare instigated a meeting to discuss putting the club back together. Breare later became the secretary of the club, which entered into the West Riding League.

Harrogate played their first competitive fixture on 30 August 1919 at Starbeck Lane Ground against Horsforth. They won the game 1–0 and the scorer was L. Craven with a headed goal. They were entered into the FA Cup the same year, losing to South Kirkby Colliery 4–0 in a 1Q replay. Harrogate also won their first trophy, the Whitworth Cup, with a 4–0 victory against Ripon City.

For the 1920–21 season Harrogate were one of the founding teams in the new Yorkshire League, yet they also continued to field a team in the West Riding League. The club had relocated to a new ground: Wetherby Road. Around the holiday periods, they took part in friendlies against higher league opposition including Liverpool at their Anfield ground, and another at fellow Yorkshire side Sheffield United in front of 15,000 fans.

They moved league once again for their third season, leaving the West Riding League and moving into the Midland Football League. It included the reserve teams of Nottingham Forest, Sheffield Wednesday and Barnsley. The club remained in the Yorkshire League, fielding a reserve team. However, the club resigned from the Midland League after only one season and reverting to fielding a first team in the Yorkshire League. The West Riding County Challenge Cup was won by Harrogate in 1925, with their 3–1 victory against Fryston Colliery at Elland Road.

League victory was secured in 1926–27, as Harrogate became the Yorkshire League champions, with Bob Morphet scoring 44 goals. The club then moved into the Northern Football League. Their second West Riding County Challenge Cup was won the same season against Selby Town. The team disbanded in 1932.

Climbing the pyramid (1935–2011)
A football club was brought back to the town in 1935 with Harrogate Hotspurs. After the Second World War, the club was renamed Harrogate Town and played in the West Yorkshire Association Football League. Harrogate Town joined the Yorkshire League again in 1957. They spent many years in the Yorkshire League during the 1960s and 1970s, and then became a founding member of the new Northern Counties East Football League in 1982. The club was looking to climb the newly instated football pyramid and so began to improve their ground, installing floodlights. They played a friendly to mark the occasion against Leeds United, with Eddie Gray being the first to switch the lights on.

After a West Riding County Cup win in 1986, and five seasons in the Northern Counties East League, they became founding members of the Northern Premier League's new First Division in 1987–88, after having been invited to join the new league. In 1990 the club became a limited company to fund construction of a new main stand, and in the same year the club won the Northern Premier League First Division Cup. They spent 15 seasons in this league, twice narrowly avoiding relegation back to the Northern Counties East League. However, they won promotion to the Premier Division in 2001–02 after finishing as champions. During their first season in that division they finished sixth, and for the first time in the club's history they reached the first round of the FA Cup, losing 5–1 to Farnborough Town of the Football Conference. Town also won the West Riding County Cup in both the 2001–02 and 2002–03 seasons.

After finishing fifth in the Premier Division in 2003–04, the club became founders of the newly established Conference North in 2004. During their FA Cup run in the 2005–06 season, Harrogate were drawn to play at Torquay United, their first cup game against Football League opposition. After drawing 1–1 at Plainmoor, they lost 6–5 on penalties after a 0–0 draw in the replay. At the end of the season the club finished fifth and qualified for the promotion play-offs, but lost 1–0 to eventual winners Stafford Rangers.

At the end of the 2009–10 season the club finished bottom of the Conference North and were due to be relegated. However, after Northwich Victoria were demoted due to financial problems, the club were reprieved.

Irving Weaver era (2011–present)
Before the start of the 2011–12 season, Bill Fotherby handed control of the club to Irving Weaver, father of manager Simon Weaver. Tad Nowakowski, father of player Adam, also joined the board to help improve community links. The 2011–12 season ended in a relegation dogfight, Harrogate saved on the last day thanks to a 5–0 away win at Corby Town.

The 2012–13 season saw the team's best run in the FA Cup. On 3 November 2012 they beat League Two team Torquay United 1–0 to go beyond the first round for the first time. Against Hastings United in the second round, they drew 1–1 at Wetherby Road, and the replay at Hastings also finished 1–1, due to a late goal from Harrogate's Tom Platt. However, Town lost 5–4 on penalties.

After a good start placing them in the top five at the beginning of the 2016–17 season, the team went on a long run of bad form. As a result, Weaver and other club officials decided that the players at the end of the season should be given full-time contracts to improve chances of promotion. Near the end of the 2016–17 season, the club announced that they would be going full-time the following season. Many players left the club following the club's change to professionalism, and the club signed multiple midfielders and defenders before their pre-season home match against Leeds United. They began training as a full-time club on 3 July 2017.

On 13 May 2018, they won the National League North play-offs for the 2017–18 season beating Brackley Town in the play-off final earning promotion to the National League.

National League (2018–20)
The club finished sixth in their 2018–19 National League campaign, qualifying for the play-offs. They were beaten 3–1 by AFC Fylde in a play-off eliminator. As the 2019–20 National League season was curtailed due to the COVID-19 pandemic, table positions were determined on average points-per-game, of which Harrogate Town had 1.78, placing them second and meaning they again qualified for the play-offs, this time in the semi-finals. In the semi-final, they beat Boreham Wood 1–0. On 2 August 2020, at Wembley Stadium, the club faced Notts County in the play-off Final and won 3–1, earning promotion to the English Football League for the first time in their history.

FA Trophy winners
On their way to the FA Trophy Final, Harrogate defeated Hartlepool United, Darlington, Eastleigh, AFC Fylde and Notts County. Harrogate won the 2019–20 FA Trophy against Concord Rangers on 3 May 2021. As a result of the almost 12-month delay in staging the Final, caused by the COVID-19 pandemic, Harrogate Town became the first EFL side in history to participate in the competition.

Football League (2020–)
On 12 September 2020, Harrogate played their first ever Football League game, winning 4–0 away at Southend United. In September 2020, Harrogate played their first ever EFL Cup match away to Tranmere Rovers which they won. In the second round, Harrogate were eliminated by Premier League side West Bromwich Albion 3–0. On 5 April 2021, their home match with Port Vale was the first English Football League game where a woman officiated as the referee. In 2020–21, Harrogate finished their first Football League season in 17th place. In 2021–22, Harrogate did enough to survive in the League again, finishing in 19th place and reached the third round of the FA Cup for the first time.

League history

Ground

The club play at Wetherby Road.  Opened on 28 August 1920, it has a capacity of 5,000 of which 1,000 is seated. The ground is situated on the A661 Wetherby Road adjacent to Harrogate District Hospital. It has covered accommodation on all four sides, as well as a hospitality lounge in the south-east corner. The club shop and a function room called the 1919 Venue are on the south side. Harrogate Town's academy also play most of their home games at Wetherby Road.

On promotion to the Football League, in August 2020, the club confirmed that, in order to comply with the League's regulations, they would replace Wetherby Road's synthetic pitch with a grass one. This was not completed by the time that the 2020–21 season commenced and the club arranged a temporary groundshare at Doncaster Rovers' Keepmoat Stadium.

The first Football League match played at Wetherby Road was on Saturday 17 October 2020 when Harrogate beat Barrow 1–0.

Current squad

Current staff

Board of Directors
Chairman:  Irving Weaver
Vice-chairman: Howard Matthews
Managing Director:  Garry Plant
Associate director:  Richard Crabb
Events director:  Angus Taylor
Operations director: Dave Riley
Finance director: Julian Davis

Coaching staff
Manager:  Simon Weaver
Assistant Manager:  Paul Thirlwell
Goalkeeping Coach: Phil Priestley
Coach:  Lee Barraclough
Physio:  Rachel Davis
Sport psychology:  Phil Lee
Academy U21s manager:  Josh Falkingham
Academy U17s manager:  Josh Walsh
Academy secretary: Dave Riley
Academy Physio:  Laura Rhys-Williams
Club scout:  Lee Barraclough

Other staff
Club Secretary:  Abbey Smith
Life President:  George Dunnington
Vice-president 1:  David Batty
Vice-president 2:  Clive Dunnington
Match Secretary:  John Harrison
Groundsmen: Jim Hague, Geoff Butler, John Fell, Iain Bullock
Club Photographer: Matt Kirkham
Media Manager: Hal Boxhall-Dockree
Ticket Manager: Hamilton Mattock
Office Administrator: Tricia Lightfoot
Facilities Manager: Mark Rowley
Bar Manager: Tricia Lightfoot

Honours
Harrogate Town's honours include:
National League 
Play-off winners: 2019–20
National League North 
Play-off winners: 2017–18
Northern Premier League
Division One champions (1): 2001–02
Division One Cup winners (1): 1989–90
Yorkshire League
Champions (1): 1926–27
Division Two champions (1): 1981–82
FA Trophy 
Winners (1): 2019–20
West Riding County Challenge Cup
Winners (8): 1925–26, 1926–27, 1962–63, 1972–73, 1985–86, 2001–02, 2002–03, 2007–08
Whitworth Cup
Winners (1): 1919–20

Records
FA Cup Best Performance
Third round: 2021–22
EFL Cup Best Performance
Second round: 2020–21
EFL Trophy Best Performance
Quarter-finals: 2021–22
FA Trophy Best Performance
Winner: 2019–20
FA Vase Best Performance
Fourth round: 1989–90

References

External links

 
Football clubs in England
Football clubs in North Yorkshire
Association football clubs established in 1914
1914 establishments in England
Sport in Harrogate
Northern Football League
West Riding County Amateur Football League
Yorkshire Football League
Midland Football League (1889)
West Yorkshire Association Football League
Northern Counties East Football League
Northern Premier League clubs
National League (English football) clubs
English Football League clubs